is a Tokyo Kyuko Electric Railway Ikegami Line station located in Ōta, Tokyo.

Station layout

Chidorichō Station has two ground-level side platforms.

History 
It was renamed to the present name on January 1, 1936.

External links   
  Chidorichõ Station (Tokyu)  

Railway stations in Japan opened in 1926
Tokyu Ikegami Line
Stations of Tokyu Corporation
Railway stations in Tokyo